The United States federal Agriculture Appropriation Act, governing agricultural appropriations for 1906, was signed into law by President Theodore Roosevelt on March 3, 1905. Under the act the Office of Public Road Inquiries and the Division of Tests within the Bureau of Chemistry were merged effective July 1, 1905 to form the Office of Public Roads.

References

Presidency of Theodore Roosevelt
1905 in the United States
1905 in law
United States federal agriculture legislation
United States federal appropriations legislation